6084 Bascom, provisional designation , is a binary Phocaea asteroid from the inner regions of the asteroid belt, approximately 6.3 kilometers in diameter. It was discovered on 12 February 1985, by American astronomer couple Carolyn and Eugene Shoemaker at Palomar Observatory in California. It is named after American geologist Florence Bascom. Its satellite measures approximately 2.3 kilometers (0.37 Ds/Dp) and has an orbital period of 43.51 hours.

Orbit and classification 

Bascom is a stony S-type asteroid and member of the Phocaea family, a group of asteroids with similar orbital characteristics. It orbits the Sun in the inner main-belt at a distance of 1.8–2.9 AU once every 3 years and 6 months (1,286 days). Its orbit has an eccentricity of 0.24 and an inclination of 23° with respect to the ecliptic. A first precovery was taken at Palomar in 1950, extending the body's observation arc by 30 years prior to its official discovery observation.

Diameter 

According to the survey carried out by NASA's Wide-field Infrared Survey Explorer with its subsequent NEOWISE mission, Bascom measures 6.17 and 6.347 kilometers in diameter and its surface has an albedo of 0.22 and 0.26, respectively. The Collaborative Asteroid Lightcurve Link (CALL) adopts Petr Pravec's revised WISE-data, that is, an albedo of 0.2091 and a diameter of 6.39 kilometers for an absolute magnitude of 13.29.

Moon and lightcurve 

Between 29 December 2005 and 2 February 2006, the first ever rotational lightcurve was obtained from photometric observations taken by astronomers David Higgins at Hunters Hill Observatory, Australia, by Petr Pravec, Peter Kušnirák, and Lenka Šarounová at Ondřejov Observatory, Czech Republic, and by Štefan Gajdoš, Adrián Galád and Jozef Világi at Modra Observatory, Slovakia.

The observations revealed, that Bascom is a synchronous binary asteroid that has a moon orbiting its primary every 43.5 hours. Mutual asteroid occulation and eclipsing events with a magnitude between 0.12 and 0.18 suggest, that the satellite's diameter is % of that of Bascom (a secondary-to-primary diameter ratio of 0.37), which translates into a mean-diameter of 2.3 kilometers for the minor-planet moon. The photometric observations had an average absolute magnitude of 12.8.

Since Bascoms first observation in December 2005, astronomer Peter Pravec has obtained additional lightcurves. They gave a refined rotation period for the primary of 2.74516 to 2.74544 hours with a brightness variation between 0.14 and 0.23 magnitude. These observations also confirmed the presence of the satellite giving a concurring orbital period of 43.51 hours. For an asteroid of its size, Bascom has a relatively fast spin rate, but still above those of fast rotators. CALL adopts a rotation period of 2.74542 hours.

Naming 

This minor planet was named in memory of Florence Bascom (1862–1945), the second woman to earn her Ph.D in geology in the United States. She was also the first woman hired by the United States Geological Survey and the first woman elected to the Council of the Geological Society of America. Bascom founded the geology department at Bryn Mawr College, Pennsylvania, where she taught the next generation of notable female geologists for 33 years. Expert in petrography, mineralogy and crystallography, her research focused on geomorphology. The approved naming citation was published by the Minor Planet Center on 11 April 1998.

Notes

References

External links 
 (6084) Bascom at johnstonsarchive, Robert Johnston
 Asteroids with Satellites, Robert Johnston, johnstonsarchive.net
 Asteroid Lightcurve Database (LCDB), query form (info )
 Dictionary of Minor Planet Names, Google books
 Asteroids and comets rotation curves, CdR – Observatoire de Genève, Raoul Behrend
 Discovery Circumstances: Numbered Minor Planets (5001)-(10000) – Minor Planet Center
 
 

006084
Discoveries by Eugene Merle Shoemaker
Discoveries by Carolyn S. Shoemaker
Named minor planets
006084
19850212